"Elephant Micah, Your Dreams Are Feeding Back" is an album by Indiana lo-fi/indie Joe O'Connell, better known as Elephant Micah. It was released in June, 2003 on BlueSanct Records.

Track listing
"zzzzzzz..."
"Turned Up to Stardom"
"Rhode Island Reds"
" $$$$$..."
"Deliver Us From Broken Glass"
"TV-Like Slow Motion"
"Duet for Mower and Chainsaw"
"O Vocabulary"
"Immune to Amusement"
"Early Instrumental"
"Remember The M Year"
"Where Do Songs?"
"Mt. Neil Young"
"Rapid Eyesight"
"Flannery's Frizzled Chicken"
"O Vocabulary"
"Cuba and the Movie Ad"
"Late Instrumental"

Elephant Micah albums